M. E. Francis was the pen name of Mary Elizabeth Blundell (née  Sweetman; 1859 – 9 March 1930) who was a prolific Irish novelist. She was described as the best known woman novelist of the day.

Biography
Mary Elizabeth Sweetman was born at Killiney Park, County Dublin to Michael James Sweetman (1829-1864), of Lamberton Park, Queen's County, JP, High Sheriff of Queen's County in 1852, and (Mary) Margaret, only child and heir of Michael Powell, of Fitzwilliam Square, Dublin. She had two brothers and three sisters. The Sweetman family were landed gentry of Longtown, County Kildare, and per family tradition were "long settled in Dublin" and "previously resident near Callan and Newtown, County Kilkenny", tracing their line back to the mid-1500s. After her father's death, when she was a small child, the remaining family moved to Brussels in 1873 and she spent her summers in Switzerland. Her sisters, Agnes Sweetman and  Elinor Sweetman were also writers.

She married Colonel Francis Nicholas Blundell (1853-1884) on 18 November 1879, and moved to Little Crosby, where his family had been notable Catholics since the 16th century. They had one son, the politician Francis Blundell, and two daughters, Margaret Elizabeth Clementina Mary and Agnes Mary Frances Blundell, MBE, both also writers. Her husband died after only five years of marriage. Blundell had written her first story when she was eight (‘True Joy’) and had a publication in the Irish Monthly the day of her wedding. She took up writing professionally after her husband's death. In later life she wrote in collaboration with her daughters.
She later retired to Dorset. Per Edwardian Fiction: An Oxford Companion (1997), "The Ireland of her youth, the Lancashire of her married life, and the Dorset of her retirement provided backgrounds for many of her volumes of fiction."

Bibliography

Further reading
 A Round Table of the Representative Irish and English Catholic Novelists: At which is Served a Feast of Excellent Stories; with Portraits, Biographical Sketches, and Bibliography, Authors incl Mary E. Sweetman Blundell ("Mrs. Francis Blundell"), Publisher Benziger Brothers, 1897
 A Dictionary of Literary Pseudonyms in the English Language, T.J. Carty,Routledge, 1 Dec 2015, 860 pages

References 

Irish women novelists
1859 births
1930 deaths
People from Killiney
People from Crosby, Merseyside